John Aubrey Casewell (fourth ¼ 1909 – second ¼ 1974) was a Welsh professional rugby league footballer who played in the 1920s and 1930s, and coached in the 1940s.

Background
Aubrey Casewell's birth was registered in Llanfyllin district, Montgomeryshire, and his death aged 64 was registered in Leeds, West Yorkshire, England.

Playing career
Casewell started his rugby league career at Salford, and went on to play for Leeds, Halifax and Keighley.

International honours
Aubrey Casewell won a cap for Wales while at Salford in 1932.

All Six Cups
Only five rugby league footballers have won "All Six Cups" during their career, they are; Aubrey Casewell (while at Salford and Leeds), Alan Edwards (while at Salford and Bradford Northern), John Etty (while at Oldham and Wakefield Trinity), Edward "Ted" Slevin (while at Wigan and Huddersfield), and Derek Turner (while at Oldham and Wakefield Trinity). "All Six Cups" being the Challenge Cup, Championship, Lancashire County Cup, Lancashire County League, Yorkshire County Cup and Yorkshire County League.

Les Diables Rouges
Casewell was one of the players who successfully toured in France with Salford in 1934, during which the Salford team earned the name "Les Diables Rouges", the seventeen players were; Joe Bradbury, Bob Brown, Aubrey Casewell, Paddy Dalton, Bert Day, Cliff Evans, Jack Feetham, George Harris, Barney Hudson, Emlyn Jenkins, Alf Middleton, Sammy Miller, Harold Osbaldestin, Les Pearson, Gus Risman, Billy Watkins and Billy Williams.

Championship final appearances
Aubrey Casewell played in Salford's 15-5 victory over Swinton in the Championship Final during the 1932–33 season, and played left-, i.e. number 11, in the 3-15 defeat by Wigan in the Championship Final during the 1933–34 season at Wilderspool Stadium, Warrington on Saturday 28 April 1934.

County League appearances
Aubrey Casewell played in Salford's victories in the Lancashire County League during the 1932–33 season, 1933–34 season and 1934–35 season, and played in Leeds' victory in the Yorkshire County League during the 1936–37 season.

Challenge Cup Final appearances
Aubrey Casewell played in Leeds' 18-2 victory over Warrington in the 1935–36 Challenge Cup Final during the 1935–36 season at Wembley Stadium, London on Saturday 18 April 1936.

County Cup Final appearances
About Aubrey Casewell's time, there was Salford's 2-15 defeat by Warrington in the 1929 Lancashire County Cup Final during the 1929–30 season at Central Park, Wigan on Saturday 23 November 1929, the 10-8 victory over Swinton in the 1931 Lancashire County Cup Final during the 1931–32 season at The Cliff, Broughton, Salford on Saturday 21 November 1931, the 21-12 victory over Wigan in the 1934 Lancashire County Cup Final during the 1934–35 season at Station Road, Swinton on Saturday 20 October 1934, the 15-7 victory over Wigan in the 1935 Lancashire County Cup Final during the 1935–36 season at Wilderspool Stadium, Warrington on Saturday 19 October 1935.

Club career
Aubrey Casewell made his début for Leeds against Warrington at Headingley, Leeds on 19 January 1835.

References

External links
Picture on flickr.com
Billy Williams 1921 to 1945
Hunslet Engine Company Rugby Club
Bonus: The Scarlet Turkey #25 - page 7
RL: Salford's French connection
Bruce and Keane set standards others should follow
(archived by web.archive.org) The Student Rugby League Alumni
(archived by web.archive.org) Les Diables Rouges – 1934 – The Original Red Devils

1909 births
1974 deaths
Featherstone Rovers coaches
Halifax R.L.F.C. players
Keighley Cougars players
Leeds Rhinos players
Rugby league players from Gwynedd
Rugby league second-rows
Salford Red Devils players
Wales national rugby league team players
Welsh rugby league coaches
Welsh rugby league players